The Hangar Theatre is a non-profit, regional theatre located at 801 Taughannock Boulevard in Ithaca, NY. Its mainstage season and children's shows occur during the summer, but the Hangar, and other organizations, utilize the space year-round for  special events. The tenets of the Hangar's mission statement are to enrich, enlighten, educate and entertain.

History 

The initial renovation of a municipal airport hangar into a theatre by Bill Carpenter, the Ithaca Youth Theatre, and Ithaca Fire Department was completed in 1969.  Bill Carpenter was hired as the first director by the Chairman of the Ithaca Festival, Tom Niederkorn, and he worked for the Board of Directors of the festival for two years. The theatre was initially called the Hangar Playfair Theatre. It continued to be renovated thanks to a grant from Nelson Rockefeller and the joint efforts of the Ithaca Repertory Theatre, Cornell University, Ithaca College, and the City of Ithaca in 1975. In 1986, the Hangar received another grant from the New York State Natural Heritage Trust to build an adjacent set and costume shop. The Hangar’s capital campaign in 1995 raised more than $270,000 for additional improvements to the facility.

From 1982-1996, under the artistic leadership of Robert Moss from New York’s Playwrights Horizons, the Hangar achieved national recognition as a professional regional theatre that produced plays and served as a learning environment for young theatre professionals. In 1988, the Hangar’s directing internship program expanded when the Drama League Project began sending emerging directors to the Hangar to direct plays in The Wedge, and in 1989 the Hangar’s Lab Company was formed.

Mark Ramont served as artistic director from 1997-2000 during a period of creative growth for the Hangar. At the same time, under Education Director Lisa Bushlow from 1991-2000, the Hangar became recognized throughout New York State and across the country for its comprehensive, year-round theatre education programs. Today, the Hangar brings a range of theatre experiences to students across New York State, with the School Tour and Artists-in-the-Schools programs.  Throughout the summer, KIDDSTUFF performances and the Next Generation School of Theatre reach thousands of young people. The Hangar currently serves approximately 60,000 adults and children annually.

In 2000, the Board appointed Lisa as the Hangar’s first executive director, at which time she recommended Kevin Moriarty as the artistic director. Under their leadership the Hangar added a New Play Festival in 2001, the Hangar tent and Starlight Café in 2002, and expanded artistic and educational programming, including the commissioning of new plays.

Robert Moss returned as Interim Artistic Director for summer 2008; Peter Flynn was named Artistic Director in August, 2008.  Josh Friedman, the serving Managing Director, assumed the role in 2012. During 2012, Stephanie Yankwitt served as the Acting Artistic Director through the end of the Mainstage season. Jen Waldman assumed the role of Artistic Director in 2013.

Michael Barakiva served the role of Artistic Director from 2015-2020. Shirley Serotsky joined the Hangar in 2019 as the Associate Artistic Director and Education Director. In 2020, she worked as the interim Artistic Director after Michael Barakiva left the position, and began working as the Artistic Director in 2021.

Collaboration with Ithaca College 
The Hangar Theatre Company experienced an extraordinary challenge as the New York State went into lockdown in March 2020. The theatre proposed delivering a collection of streaming shows after partnering with Ithaca College Associate Professor Chrissy Guest and alumnus Griffin Schultz.

Seasons

Mainstage

2011
Rounding Third
Ragtime
Ever So Humble
Gem of the Ocean
The Rocky Horror Show

2012
Lend Me a Tenor
Titanic
Full Gallop
Next to Normal
The Trip to Bountiful

2013
Last of the Red Hot Lovers
Gypsy
4000 Miles
Clybourne Park

2014
Red
Around the World in 80 Days
Little Shop of Horrors
Other Desert Cities

2015
God of Carnage - By Yasmina Reza
Spring Awakening 
The Hound of the Baskervilles
Talley's Folly

2016
I Loved, I Lost, I Made Spaghetti - Adapted by Jacques Lamarre from the memoir by Giulia Melucci
In The Heights - by Lin-Manuel Miranda
Third - by Wendy Wasserstein
Constellation - by  Nick Payne

2017
Disgraced - by Ayad Akhtar
A Funny Thing Happened on the Way to the Forum - by Stephen Sondheim 
Dégagé - by Mimi Quillin
The Foreigner - by Larry Shue
Shakespeare’s R & J - Adapted by Joe Calarco

2018
Fortune - by Deborah Zoe Laufer
Chicago - by Fred Ebb, Bob Fosse & John Kander
Pride and Prejudice - Adapted by Kate Hamill
A Doll's House, Part 2 - by Lucas Hnath
Xanadu - by Douglas Carter Beane, John Farrar & Jeff Lynne
Charles Dicken's A Christmas Carol - Adapted by Aoise Stratford

KIDDSTUFF

2011
Alice in Wonderland
If You Give a Pig a Pancake
Click Clack Moo: Cows That Type
Goodnight Moon
Willy Wonka Jr.

2012
The Little Mermaid
The Adventures of the Dish and the Spoon
Junie B. Jones in Jingle Bells
Batman Smells!
How I Became a Pirate
Seussical Jr.

2013
PINKALICIOUS the Musical
With Two Wings
A Year With Frog and Toad
James and the Giant Peach
The Wiz

2014
Yo
Vikings
Bunnicula
Hare and Tortoise
The Little Prince
The Pirates of Penzance Jr.

2015
The Emperor's New Clothes
Stuart Little
Red Riding Hood
Charlotte's Web
Bye Bye Birdie

2016
Journey to Oz
The Lion, The Witch, and The Wardrobe
Louis Braille
The Velveteen Rabbit
My Son Pinocchio Jr.

2017
Lilly's Plastic Purple Purse
Furry Tails, With a Twist
The Journey of Lewis and Clark and Other Tales from Way Out West
Aesop's Fables
Alice in Wonderland Jr.

2018
Playing Peter Pan - by Christopher Parks
The Amazing Tale of the Backyard Overnight Adventure - by Rachel Lampert
The Transition of Doodle Pequeño - by Gabriel Jason Dean
Snow White - by Marjorie Sokoloff
Seussical Jr. - by Lynn Ahrens & Stephen Flaherty

Education Programming 
The Hangar Theatre promotes arts education through year-long programming for children and families.

KIDDSTUFF 
Every year the Hangar Theatre features live theatre based on favorite children's books and stories that is created for young audiences. The KIDDSTUFF season occurs during the summer and usually features five performances, the last of which is performed by students of the Hangar's Next Generation summer theatre camp.

Next Generation 
Next Generation is a summer camp for students entering grades 3-12. The camp offers a wide variety of classes taught by professional artists who work nationally in the performing arts. Students of the camp are featured in the last KIDDSTUFF production of the season.

Spring Break-a-Leg 
Spring Break-a-Leg is a week-long camp for students in 4th through 6th grade. At the end of the camp, students present an original musical theatre piece.

Artists-in-Schools and School Tours 
The Hangar offers programs that bring theatre arts into the schools of children in the Ithaca area. Artists-in-Schools initiatives bring Hangar artists into elementary and middle schools to collaborate with classrooms in creating original plays with music.

School tours present theatre arts productions at schools in the Ithaca, NY area. "We Carry the Dream", a new play based on the life and work of Martin Luther King Jr., toured Newfield Elementary School, Dryden Elementary School, Lansing Elementary School, Groton Elementary School and Trumansburg Elementary School in March 2013.

Lab Company and Lab Academy

The Lab Company 
Since 1989 the Hangar Theatre has been home to the Lab Company, a theatre-training program for young professionals in acting, directing, choreography, design, and play writing. The Lab Company is a training ground for emerging artists where the focus is on professional experience, preparing new artists for a career in the theatre.

Lab Company actors work in the Hangar Mainstage & KIDDSTUFF series, as well as develop new work in the Hangar Pilot Reading Series, over the course of one summer.

The Lab Academy 
The Lab Academy, created in 2013, is geared towards advanced undergraduate actors, directors, dramaturgs, playwrights, and choreographers with an emphasis in education. All Lab Academy members participate in multiple master classes and workshops in acting, collaboration, voice and speech, dance, movement, and professional skills taught by professional artists from across the nation.

Lab Academy actors act in the Hangar's experimental Wedge Theatre, its KIDDSTUFF series, and work projects throughout the summer. Academy actors may also understudy Mainstage roles. Academy Directors, Dramaturgs, Playwrights, & Choreographers participate in the same classes with the rest of the company. They participate in one MAINSTAGE experience, as well as projects in their particular field of study.

References

External links 
 

Theatres in New York (state)